P.O. Elassona Football Club is a Greek football club based in Elassona, Larissa, Greece.

Honors

National
 Gamma Ethniki: 1
 1976-77
 Delta Ethniki: 1
 1983-84

Domestic

 Larissa FCA Champions: 2
 1987–88, 2008-09 (as PS Elassona)
 Larissa FCA Cup Winners: 3
 2010-11 (as PS Elassona), 2018–19, 2021–22

References

Larissa
Association football clubs established in 1957
1957 establishments in Greece
Gamma Ethniki clubs